Adaina bipunctatus is a moth of the family Pterophoridae. It is found in the United States, including Florida and Mississippi. It has also been recorded from Trinidad, the West Indies, Brazil and Ecuador.

The wingspan is 9–11.5 mm. Adults are entirely pale yellowish white, although the head is touched with pale brownish above and on the front. The forewings have a few brown scales and several brown spots. The fringes are slightly tinged with grey, as are the hindwings and their fringes.

Adults are on wing from January to April and again in August in the tropics. In Florida they have been recorded from the end of March to the end of June and again from mid-August to mid-December.

The larvae feed on Conoclinium coelestinum, Carphephorus paniculatus, Carphephorus odoratissimus, Pluchea rosea and Eupatorium cannabinum. The feed within the composite flower heads of their host plant.

References

Moths described in 1890
Oidaematophorini